Abdel-illa Lamriq, better known as DJ Abdel, is a French DJ and record producer playing hip hop, funk and contemporary R&B on major radio stations in France.

DJ Abdel became known through his musical participation in the French Canal+ television show Nulle Part Ailleurs as a member of its band. He joined Dee Nasty and the dance troupe "Black Blanc Beur" (also known as B3) in touring. He also collaborated with DJ Cut Killer in forming "Double H Productions" that produced many albums most notably for 113, a French hip hop group with African and Caribbean roots.

He has broadcast music mixes on several French radio stations including on his own daily show on Fun Radio. He DJs in NRJ with a weekly show "Master Mix" and 1-hour weekly show on FG DJ Radio. His musical style is a mix of hip hop, of funk and contemporary R&B.

He wrote the musical parts for the French sitcom H and French animated series Funky Cops. He also took part in writing music materials for films including Zak Fishman’s Gamer, Fabrice Genstal’s La Squale, Thomas Girou's sequel of La Vérité si je mens ! and in 2005 Merzak Allouache's Bab el web.

In October 2007, DJ Abdel officiated at the French Star Academy, on TF1, as Official DJ.

Discography

Albums

Mixes

Hip Hop Party Soul V (with DJ Cut Killer)
Total R'N'B 1
Total R'N'B 2
Hip Hop Party Soul VI

Singles

*Did not appear in the official Belgian Ultratop 50 charts, but rather in the bubbling under Ultratip charts.

Film Soundtracks
1998: H (TV series) (composer)
2001: La vérité si je mens! 2 (composer)
2005: Bab el web (composer)
2006: Arthur et les Minimoys

Filmography
Funky Cops (2003) (music for the French series)

References

External links 
 
DJ Abdel MySpace site
DJ Abdel page on FG DJ Radio

French DJs
Year of birth missing (living people)
Living people
French people of Moroccan descent
French hip hop record producers